Rudi Hübner (born June 15, 1986) is a German footballer who currently plays for SV Wiesbaden.

External links

1986 births
Living people
German footballers
Latvian emigrants to Germany
SV Darmstadt 98 players
3. Liga players
Association football forwards